John Duane may refer to:
John F. Duane, American politician from New York
William John Duane (1780–1865), American politician from Pennsylvania
John Duane Park (1819–1896), American judge from Connecticut